The 40th Filmfare Awards were held on 25 February 1995. 

1942: A Love Story and Hum Aapke Hain Koun..!, which is one of the most successful films of Bollywood, led the ceremony with 13 nominations each, followed by Mohra with 9 nominations and Krantiveer with 7 nominations.  

1942: A Love Story won 9 awards, including Best Supporting Actor (for Jackie Shroff) and Best Music Director (a posthumous win for R. D. Burman), thus becoming the most-awarded film at the ceremony.

Hum Aapke Hain Koun..! was the runner-up of the ceremony with 5 awards, including Best Film, Best Director (Barjatya), Best Actress (Dixit) and Special Award (Lata Mangeshkar for "Didi Tera Devar Deewana").

Madhuri Dixit received dual nominations for Best Actress for her performances in Anjaam and Hum Aapke Hain Koun..!, winning for the latter.

Main awards

Best Film 
 Hum Aapke Hain Koun..! 
1942: A Love Story
Andaz Apna Apna
Krantiveer
Mohra

Best Director
 Sooraj Barjatya – Hum Aapke Hain Koun..! 
Mehul Kumar – Krantiveer
Rajiv Rai – Mohra
Rajkumar Santoshi – Andaz Apna Apna
Vidhu Vinod Chopra – 1942: A Love Story

Best Actor
 Nana Patekar – Krantiveer 
Aamir Khan – Andaz Apna Apna
Akshay Kumar – Yeh Dillagi
Anil Kapoor – 1942: A Love Story
Shah Rukh Khan – Kabhi Haan Kabhi Naa

Best Actress
 Madhuri Dixit – Hum Aapke Hain Koun..! 
Kajol – Yeh Dillagi
Madhuri Dixit – Anjaam
Manisha Koirala – 1942: A Love Story
Sridevi – Laadla

Best Supporting Actor
 Jackie Shroff – 1942: A Love Story 
Anupam Kher – Hum Aapke Hain Koun..!
Mohnish Bahl – Hum Aapke Hain Koun..!
Saif Ali Khan – Main Khiladi Tu Anari
Sunil Shetty – Dilwale

Best Supporting Actress
 Dimple Kapadia – Krantiveer 
Aruna Irani – Suhaag
Raveena Tandon – Laadla 
Reema Lagoo – Hum Aapke Hain Koun..!
Renuka Shahane – Hum Aapke Hain Koun..!

Best Comedian
 Shakti Kapoor – Raja Babu 
Kader Khan – Main Khiladi Tu Anari
Laxmikant Berde – Hum Aapke Hain Koun..!
Paresh Rawal – Mohra
Shakti Kapoor – Andaz Apna Apna

Best Villain
 Shah Rukh Khan – Anjaam 
Danny Denzongpa – Krantiveer
Danny Denzongpa – Vijaypath
Naseeruddin Shah – Mohra

Best Music Director 
 1942: A Love Story – R.D. Burman 
Hum Aapke Hain Koun..! – Raamlaxman
Main Khiladi Tu Anari – Anu Malik
Mohra – Viju Shah
Yeh Dillagi – Dilip Sen-Sameer Sen

Best Lyricist
 1942: A Love Story – Javed Akhtar for Ek Ladki Ko Dekha 
Hum Aapke Hain Koun..! – Dev Kohli for Hum Aapke Hain Koun..!
Mohra – Anand Bakshi for Tu Cheez Badi Hai
Yeh Dillagi – Sameer for Ole Ole

Best Playback Singer, Male
 1942: A Love Story – Kumar Sanu for Ek Ladki Ko Dekha 
Hum Aapke Hain Koun..! – S. P. Balasubramaniam for Hum Aapke Hain Koun..!
Mohra – Udit Narayan for Tu Cheez Badi Hai
Yeh Dillagi – Abhijeet for Ole Ole

Best Playback Singer, Female
 1942: A Love Story – Kavita Krishnamurthy for Pyaar Hua Chupke Se 
Main Khiladi Tu Anari – Alka Yagnik for Chura Ke Dil
Mohra – Kavita Krishnamurthy for Tu Cheez Badi Hai
Vijaypath – Alisha Chinai for Ruk Ruk Ruk
Vijaypath – Alka Yagnik for Raah Main

Best Debut
 Tabu – Vijaypath

Lux New Face of the Year
 Sonali Bendre – Aag

Best Story
 Krantiveer – K. K. Singh

Best Screenplay
 Hum Aapke Hain Koun..! – Sooraj Barjatya

Best Dialogue
 Krantiveer – K. K. Singh

R. D. Burman Award
 A. R. Rahman

Best Action
 Anth

Best Art Direction
 1942: A Love Story

Best Choreography
 Mohra – Tu Cheez Badi Hai

Best Cinematography
 1942: A Love Story

Best Editing
 1942: A Love Story

Best Sound
 1942: A Love Story

Lifetime Achievement Award
 Shammi Kapoor and Waheeda Rehman

Special Award
Lata Mangeshkar for singing the song "Didi Tera Devar Deewana" for the film Hum Aapke Hain Koun..! as long back, she stopped accepting nominations for Best Female Playback SInger to promote new talent. However, Filmfare gave her the Special Award to honor her rendition.

Critics' Awards

Best Film (Best Director)
 Bandit Queen (Shekhar Kapoor)

Best Actress
 Farida Jalal – Mammo

Best Documentary
 Manzar

Biggest Winners
1942: A Love Story – 9/13
Hum Aapke Hain Koun..! – 5/13
Krantiveer – 4/7
Mohra – 1/9
Vijaypath– 1/4

See also
 41st Filmfare Awards
 42nd Filmfare Awards
 Filmfare Awards

References

External links
 Filmfare Awards 1995 at the IMDb

Filmfare Awards
Filmfare